This is a list of commanders of the Armed Forces of the Islamic Republic of Iran during the Iran–Iraq War (1980–88).

Leaders 
Commander-in-Chief of the Iranian Armed Forces
 Abolhassan Banisadr (Start of War – 10 June 1981)
 Ruhollah Khomeini (10 June 1981 – End of War)
 Akbar Hashemi Rafsanjani, acted as the de facto commander-in-chief since mid-1980s and was later officially appointed as the deputy commander-in-chief on 2 June 1988
 Hassan Rouhani, served as deputy to second-in-command since 1988

Military commanders

Strategic level

Islamic Republic of Iran Army 
Chief-of-Staff
 Brig. Gen. Valiollah Fallahi (Start of War – 29 September 1981)
 Brig. Gen. Qasem-Ali Zahirnejad (1 October 1981 – 25 October 1984)
 Col. Esmaeil Sohrabi (25 October 1984 – 1988)
 Brig. Gen. Ali Shahbazi (1988 – End of War)
Ground Force
 Brig. Gen. Qasem-Ali Zahirnejad (Start of War – 1 October 1981)
 Col. Ali Sayyad Shirazi (1 October 1981 – Spring 1986)
 Col. Hossein Hassani-Sadi (Spring 1986 – End of War)
Air Force
 Col. Javad Fakoori (Start of War – 29 September 1981)
 Col. Mohammad-Hossein Moinpour (2 October 1981 – 25 November 1983)
 Col. Houshang Seddigh (25 November 1983 – 1986)
 Col. Mansour Sattari (1986 – End of War)
Navy
 Cpt. Bahram Afzali (Start of War – 30 April 1983)
 Cpt. Esfandiar Hosseini (30 April 1983 – 25 June 1985)
 Cpt. Mohammad-Hossein Malekzadegan (25 June 1985 – End of War)

Islamic Revolutionary Guard Corps 
Commander-in-Chief
 Morteza Rezaee (Start of War –)
 Mohsen Rezaei (11 September 1981 – End of War)
General Staff
 Alireza Afshar (November 1984 – )
 Mohammad Forouzandeh (– End of War)
Basij
 Amir Majd (Start of War – December 1981)
 Ahmad Salek (December 1981 –)
 Mohammad-Ali Rahmani (16 February 1984 – End of War)
Ground Force
 Yahya Rahim Safavi (1985–)
 Ali Shamkhani (May 1986 –)
Air Force
 Akbar Rafan (1985 – End of War)
Navy
 Hossein Alaei (1985 – End of War)

Operational level

Islamic Republic of Iran Army 
Division commanders
 Col. Hassan Abshenasan
 Col. Masoud Monfared Niyaki
 Col. Hasan Aghareb Parast

Islamic Revolutionary Guard Corps 
Division commanders
 Hossein Kharrazi
 Mohammad Bagher Ghalibaf
 Ahmad Kazemi
 Mohammad Boroujerdi
 Ebrahim Hemmat
 Qassem Soleimani
 Mehdi Bakeri
 Ahmad Motevaselian
 Mehdi Zeinoddin
 Mahmoud Kaveh
 Ali Hashemi (Commander)
 Sabz Ali Khodadad (Commander)

Ministers 
Minister of Defence
 Mostafa Chamran (Start of War – 29 October 1980)
 Col. Javad Fakoori (–September 1980)
 Col. Mousa Namjoo (17–29 September 1981)
 Col. Mohammad Salimi (October 1981 – October 1985)
 Col. Mohammad Hossein Jalali (October 1985 – End of War)
Minister of Revolutionary Guards
Mohsen Rafighdoost (November 1982 – End of War)

References 

Iranian military personnel of the Iran–Iraq War
Iranian military commanders
Iranian military-related lists
Lists of Iranian military personnel